The Prize For Freedom is an annual prize presented by the Liberal International since 1985. With the prize the organization honors an individual which has made an outstanding contribution to human rights and political freedoms. The Prize is one of the highest awards focused on the people who would persevere and promote world liberality.

Awards

See also
 Oxford Manifesto

Sources
 Prize for Freedom
 Aliaksandr Milinkevich

Human rights awards
Politics awards
Awards established in 1985
1985 establishments in the United Kingdom